Biton is a genus of daesiid camel spiders, first described by Ferdinand Karsch in 1880.

Species 
, the World Solifugae Catalog accepts the following sixty-eight species:

 Biton adamanteus Lawrence, 1968 — Namibia, South Africa
 Biton arenicola Lawrence, 1966 — Namibia
 Biton bellulus (Pocock, 1902) — Egypt
 Biton bernardi (Pocock, 1900) — South Africa
 Biton betschuanicus (Kraepelin, 1908) — Botswana, South Africa
 Biton browni (Lawrence, 1965) — Namibia, South Africa
 Biton brunneus Roewer, 1933 — Morocco
 Biton brunnipes Pocock, 1896 — Ethiopia, Kenya, Somalia
 Biton cataractus Lawrence, 1968 — Namibia, South Africa
 Biton crassidens Lawrence, 1935 — South Africa
 Biton cursorius Roewer, 1933 — Togo
 Biton divaricatus Roewer, 1933 — Togo
 Biton ehrenbergi Karsch, 1880 — Cyprus, Egypt, Ethiopia, Greece, Israel, Italy (mainland), Saudi Arabia, Somalia, Sudan, Tunisia
 Biton fallax (Borelli, 1925) — Libya
 Biton fessanus Roewer, 1933 — Libya
 Biton fuscipes Pocock, 1897 — Ethiopia, Somalia
 Biton fuscus (Kraepelin, 1899) — Algeria
 Biton gaerdesi Roewer, 1954 — Namibia
 Biton gariesensis (Lawrence, 1931) — South Africa
 Biton haackei Lawrence, 1968 — South Africa
 Biton habereri (Kraepelin, 1929) — Chad
 Biton hottentottus (Kraepelin, 1899) — Namibia, South Africa
 Biton kolbei (Purcell, 1899) — South Africa, Zimbabwe
 Biton kraekolbei Wharton, 1981 — Namibia, South Africa
 Biton laminatus (Pocock, 1903) — Yemen
 Biton leipoldti (Purcell, 1899) — South Africa
 Biton lineatus (Pocock, 1902) — South Africa
 Biton lividus Simon, 1882 — Egypt, Eritrea, Sudan
 Biton longisetosus Lawrence, 1972 — South Africa
 Biton magnifrons (Birula, 1905) — Ethiopia, Israel
 Biton monodentatus Delle Cave, 1978 — Somalia
 Biton mossambicus Roewer, 1954 — Mozambique
 Biton namaqua (Kraepelin, 1899) — Namibia, South Africa
 Biton ovambicus (Lawrence, 1927) — Namibia
 Biton pallidus (Purcell, 1899) — South Africa
 Biton pearsoni (Hewitt, 1914) — Namibia, South Africa
 Biton persicus (Birula, 1905) — Iran
 Biton philbyi Lawrence, 1954 — Saudi Arabia
 Biton pimenteli Frade, 1940 — Angola
 Biton planirostris (Birula, 1941) — Yemen
 Biton ragazzii (Kraepelin, 1899) — Djibouti, Eritrea, Sudan
 Biton rhodesianus (Hewitt, 1914) — South Africa, Zimbabwe
 Biton roeweri (Lawrence, 1935) — Zimbabwe
 Biton rossicus (Birula, 1905) — Iran, Kazakhstan, Tajikistan, Turkmenistan, Uzbekistan
 Biton sabulosus (Pocock, 1903) — Saudi Arabia, Yemen
 Biton schelkovnikovi (Birula, 1936) — Armenia, Azerbaijan
 Biton schreineri (Purcell, 1903) — South Africa
 Biton schultzei (Kraepelin, 1908) — Botswana, South Africa
 Biton simoni (Kraepelin, 1899) — Djibouti, Somalia
 Biton striatus (Lawrence, 1928) — Namibia, South Africa
 Biton subulatus (Purcell, 1899) — South Africa
 Biton tarabulus Roewer, 1933 — Libya
 Biton tauricus Roewer, 1941 — Turkey
 Biton tenuifalcis Lawrence, 1962 — Namibia, South Africa
 Biton tigrinus Pocock, 1898 — Kenya
 Biton transvaalensis Lawrence, 1949 — South Africa
 Biton triseriatus Lawrence, 1955 — Namibia, South Africa
 Biton truncatidens Lawrence, 1954 — Saudi Arabia
 Biton tunetanus Simon, 1885 — Algeria, Israel, Libya, Tunisia
 Biton turkestanus (Roewer, 1933) — China
 Biton vachoni Lawrence, 1966 — Algeria
 Biton velox Simon, 1885 — Ethiopia, Israel, Italy, Kenya, Libya, Somalia, Tunisia
 Biton villiersi (Vachon, 1950) — Niger
 Biton villosus Roewer, 1933 — Ethiopia, Somalia
 Biton werneri Roewer, 1933 — Namibia
 Biton wicki (Birula, 1915) — Egypt, Ethiopia, Somalia, Sudan, Yemen
 Biton xerxes (Roewer, 1933) — Iran
 Biton zederbaueri (Werner, 1905) — Israel, Turkey

References 

Arachnid genera
Solifugae